Pushkar Sudhakar Shrotri is a Marathi, Hindi film & theatre actor, producer, and director.

Early life and education
Shrotri was born in Mumbai in 1970. He graduated with a commerce degree from M. L. Dahanukar College in Mumbai.

Career
Pushkar has also acted in a Marathi theater play Hasva Fasvi in which he has played 6 distinctively different character roles.

He has acted in over 25 movies in Hindi and Marathi languages and is particularly known for the comic roles and timing. In 2014 movie Rege, he played the role of real life cop Sachin Waze.

He directed the Marathi film Ubuntu, which was released on 15 September 2017.

Awards
Pushkar has received the 'Favourite Sahayak Abhineta' (Favourite Supporting Actor) award of Maharashtracha Favourite Kon (2014) for his role in movie Rege.

Filmography

Television

Films

Drama 
Hasva Fasavi
Suryachi Pille
A Perfect Murder

References

External links

Male actors in Marathi cinema
Living people
1970 births
Male actors in Marathi television